Bowling Green–Warren County Regional Airport  is two miles southeast of Bowling Green, in Warren County, Kentucky. It is owned by the City of Bowling Green and Warren County.

History
The site was established in 1934 as a military airfield. Shortly after the end of WWII the airport was served by an intrastate airline, Bluegrass Airlines through fall 1946. On August 1, 1948 Eastern Airlines added Bowling Green to its Chicago to Atlanta route.  Aircraft used were the Douglas DC-3, Martin 4-0-4, and the Lockheed L-188 Electra. In 1969 Eastern contracted to Air South and Wright Airlines to serve Bowling Green. The last Wright Airlines flight left Bowling Green around 4:30 pm, September 10, 1972, leaving the airport without airline service.

Charter flights for Western Kentucky University Men's and Women's athletic programs use the airport regularly.

Airlines and destinations

Bowling Green–Warren County Regional Airport had seasonal service on a single airline, Contour Airlines, to Destin–Fort Walton Beach Airport in Destin, Florida. Service to Destin resumed on May 13, 2017 and continued through August 13, 2017. Contour Airlines began serving Bowling Green–Warren County Regional Airport on August 29, 2016 with twice daily flights to Atlanta and twice weekly flights to Destin on a seasonal basis. This marked the first time Bowling Green had scheduled commercial service since 1972. The seasonal flights to Destin ended in late October. On November 1, 2016, service to Atlanta was reduced from two flights a day to one. It was announced on December 9, 2016 that the flights to Atlanta would end on January 8, 2017, due to insufficient demand.

Facilities
 Runway 3/21: 6,500 x 150 ft (1,981 x 46 m) Asphalt
 Runway 12/30: 3,955 x 150 ft (1,205 x 46 m) Asphalt

In the year ending November 30, 2005 the airport had 62,640 aircraft operations, average 171 per day: 96% general aviation, 3% military, 1% air taxi and <1% airline. 74 aircraft were based at the airport: 85% single engine, 9% multi-engine (7) and 5% jet.

 Fixed-Base Operator: Co-Mar Aviation - Operations include aircraft maintenance, fuel services, and aircraft hangars/tie downs.

Future developments
In December 2015 the city and the airport reviewed a proposal to expand the terminal at a cost of $1.8 million. The expanded facility would be about 9,000 to 10,000 sq. ft. and would be built based on demand.

References

External links
Bowling Green–Warren County Regional Airport (official site)
Co-Mar Aviation (FBO)

Airports in Kentucky
Buildings and structures in Warren County, Kentucky
Transportation in Warren County, Kentucky